Badrul is a given name. Notable people with the name include:

A. M. Badrul Ala, Bangladesh Nationalist Party politician and the former Member of Parliament
Badrul Alam (1929–1980), Bangladeshi language activist, physician and medical academic
Farid Badrul, Grand Prix motorcycle racer from Malaysia
Badrul Haider Chowdhury (1925–1998), the Chief Justice of Bangladesh in December 1989
Sulaiman Badrul Alam Shah of Johor (1699–1760), the 12th Sultan of Johor and Pahang, Malaysia
Badrul Khan, author and educator focused on web-based training and educational technology
Badrul Hisyam Abdul Manap (born 1997), Malaysian competitive runner
Badrul Miah, tried in 1995 for the murder of 15-year-old Richard Everitt in London, and given a life sentence
Badrul Hisyam Morris (born 1987), Malaysian footballer
Badrul Anam Saud, Bangladeshi film director and scriptwriter
Badrul Hisham Shaharin (born 1978), Malaysian activist and politician
Sulaiman Badrul Alam Shah of Terengganu (1895–1942), the 14th Sultan of Terengganu, Malaysia
Mohd Badrul Azam Mohd Zamri, Malaysian professional football player

See also
Badrul-Badur, a princess whom Aladdin married in The Story of Aladdin
Bedrule